Mzimba is a district in the Northern Region of Malawi. The capital is Mzimba. The district covers an area of 10,430 km.² and has a population of 610,944. It is the largest district in Malawi.

Geography
The Viphya Mountains extend through the southern and eastern portion of the district. The Mzimba Plain occupies the central portion of the district, drained by the South Rukuru River and its tributaries. The western boundary of the district lies along the Malawi-Zambia border, where a low divide separates the basin of the South Rukuru from Zambia's Luangwa River basin.

Government

There are twelve National Assembly constituencies in Mzimba:

 Mzimba - Central
 Mzimba - East
 Mzimba - Hora
 Mzimba - Luwelezi
 Mzimba - Mzuzu City
 Mzimba - North
 Mzimba - North East
 Mzimba - Solora
 Mzimba - South
 Mzimba - South East
 Mzimba - South West
 Mzimba - West

Since 2009.

Cities in Mzimba District
Mzimba (capital)
Mzuzu 
Ekwendeni

Economy
The most common occupations are subsistence farming of maize and beans supplemented by cattle herding, in addition tobacco is grown as a cash crop.  There are currently 98 active educational committees in Mzimba.

Demographics
At the time of the 2018 Census of Malawi, the distribution of the population of Mzimba District by ethnic group was as follows:
 78.3% Tumbuka
 9.1% Chewa
 6.3% Ngoni
 1.4% Lomwe
 1.1% Yao
 1.0% Tonga
 0.9% Sukwa
 0.4% Lambya
 0.3% Nkhonde
 0.1% Sena
 0.1% Mang'anja
 0.1% Nyanja
 0.8% Others

Culture
The district consists of people of Tumbuka with their Cultural Dance (VIMBUZA)origin. and also descendants of Ngoni people from South Africa with their Cultural Dance (Ingoma) However the main language spoken is chiTumbuka. The district headquarters is at Mzimba. However, the biggest town is Mzuzu, which is also the administrative headquarters of the Northern Region of Malawi.

It is also the centre of netball in Malawi, Malawi's most successful sport. Most of the players in the national team, including international star Mwayi Kumwenda were born and grew up in Mzimba.

History 
History states that the Zwangendaba Ngonis were warriors who settled in northern Malawi. However, once Zwangendaba head of the family died, his sons resettled to what is now the Mzimba District and seven of his descendants still rule. Mzimba, which means human body, was riddled by calls to split the district into three in early 2016. Citizens and some officials wanted the province to be split, while the head ruler was not in favor of it.

Famous People 
Mwayi Kumwenda (1989- ), a netball player for the Malawi national team.

See also
Embangweni
Kanjuchi
Chikangawa
Euthin
Edingen
Manyamula
Mphelembe
Eswazin
Mbalachanda
Enukweni
Bulala

References

USAID - Aid from the American People

Districts of Malawi
Districts in Northern Region, Malawi